Nightlife is an Australian late-night talkback show across ABC Local Radio hosted by Philip Clark and Suzanne Hill.

It offers a mix of both news and current affairs, lifestyle and entertainment. Each night there are regular features and presenters. The listening audience is heavily featured throughout the program.

Nightlife is broadcast on weekday nights from 10.10 pm to 2.00 am (AEST) on ABC Local Radio across Australia, and is followed by Overnights. The show is broadcast on delay to South Australia and the Northern Territory.

Hosts 
In July 2016, Tony Delroy announced that he would be retiring from the show after 26 years as host. He hosted his last show on 2 September 2016. Dominic Knight hosted the show until October 2016.

In September 2016, ABC announced that Philip Clark from 666 ABC Canberra will host Nightlife. In November 2016, ABC confirmed that Phillip Clark would host the show from Monday to Thursday and Sarah MacDonald will host from Friday to Sunday.

In December 2019, ABC announced that Sarah MacDonald will host Evenings on ABC Radio Sydney in January 2020. She hosted her last show on 8 December 2019.

In January 2020, ABC announced that Indira Naidoo will replace Sarah MacDonald and host the show from Friday to Sunday from Friday 7 February. In December 2022, ABC announced that Indira Naidoo will replace Sarah MacDonald as host of Evenings on ABC Radio Sydney in January 2023. Suzanne Hill will replace Naidoo. 

Dominic Knight and James O'Loghlin are regular fill in presenters.

History 
In November 2016, ABC announced that Nightlife would move to a 7-day format. This decision was met with criticism from within Australian country music circles and from Australian religious leaders as the new 7-day format prompted the ABC to remove the long-running Saturday Night Country with Felicity Urquhart from metropolitan ABC stations and to completely axe the religious and ethics program Sunday Nights with John Cleary.

Segments
The show usually has a guest in the first hour, including a large portion of the time set for audience talkback. The second hour also has guests, but without a talkback section followed by "What The Papers Say", when the major Australian newspapers reveal their main stories for the next day. The third hour usually involves a quiz named "The Mighty Challenge", while the fourth hour includes another chance for audience feedback in the "Issue of the Day", followed by a book reading.

In 2007, the popular "Not the Nightly News" segment was discontinued.

Regular guests
 Andrew Cate - exercise
 Paul Clitheroe - finance and money
 Fabian Dattner - business management
 Nerida Cole - superannuation
 Stephanie Dowrick - personal and spiritual development
 Toby Hagon - motoring
 CJ Johnson - movies
 Petrea King - emotions and spiritual health
 Kel Richards - words
 Francine St George - physiotherapy
Rochelle Jackson - true crime
 Roland Sussex - language
 Dr Brad McKay - medicine
 Roderick Eime - travel

References

External links
Nightlife

Australian Broadcasting Corporation radio programs